The Stanthorpe Border Post was a newspaper published in Stanthorpe, Queensland, Australia. It was published twice weekly. The newspaper published its final print edition in June 2020 but continues in an online-only format.

History

The newspaper Border Post and Stannum Miner was first published on 20 July 1872 in Stanthorpe on foolscap paper. Later it was published on broadsheet. In 1971 the title was simplified to Border Post and the newspaper printed as a tabloid.

The title Stannum Miner was then adopted by the Stanthorpe and District Historical Society as the name for their journal (formerly known as the Bulletin).

In 1994, Australian Provincial Newspapers acquired a controlling interest in the Border Post.

Along with many other regional Australian newspapers owned by NewsCorp, the newspaper ceased print editions in June 2020 and became an online-only publication from 26 June 2020.

References

Further reading

External links

 

Newspapers published in Queensland
Stanthorpe, Queensland
APN Australian Regional Media